Hotel des Arts is a boutique hotel in San Francisco, California.  When it opened in 2005, 16 of its 51 rooms were painted by local artists–today 38 rooms are. Materials used include wall-mounted vinyl records, plastic bags, graffiti, fabrics, three-dimensional art work, and even installations.

Rooms
Room 404, painted by Tim Gaskin, was the source of some controversy. The walls are adorned with larger-than-life Louis Vuitton logos as well as an image of Madonna. Louis Vuitton sent a cease-and-desist letter to the hotel ordering them to remove the logos, but the hotel refused and instead held a special public exhibition to display the room. Now the hotel's website has a disclaimer on the page for the room, which states, "Please Note: Room 404 is painted with fine art murals by Tim Gaskin. Hotel des Arts is in no way associated with any of the companies or celebrities whose trademarks and likenesses appear in the murals."

Featured artists
Hotel des Arts roster of featured artists include:

References

External links
 Hotel des Arts Official site
 Painted room descriptions
 Video interviews and tour of the hotel
 Video interviews – Bastille Day Reception – July 2005

Hotels established in 2005
Hotels in San Francisco